
Year 115 BC was a year of the pre-Julian Roman calendar. At the time it was known as the Year of the Consulship of Scaurus and Metellus (or, less frequently, year 639 Ab urbe condita) and the Second Year of Yuanding. The denomination 115 BC for this year has been used since the early medieval period, when the Anno Domini calendar era became the prevalent method in Europe for naming years.

Events 
 By place 

 Roman Republic 
 Gaius Marius is praetor in Rome: he defeats Celtic tribes in modern-day Spain.
 Marcus Aemilius Scaurus defeats the Carni Celtic tribes of Northern Italy, leading to their submission to Roman rule.

 Middle East 
 Parthia makes a trade treaty with China.
 The Kingdom of Sheba collapses.

Births 
 Marcus Licinius Crassus, Roman general and consul (d. 53 BC)

Deaths 
 Publius Mucius Scaevola, Roman consul and jurist 
 Quintus Caecilius Metellus Macedonicus, Roman consul (b. c. 210 BC)

References